The Air Force Systems Command (AFSC) is an inactive United States Air Force Major Command. It was established in April 1951, being split off from Air Materiel Command. The mission of AFSC was Research and Development for new weapons systems.

Overview
AFSC took on engineering functions which formerly resided in the Air Materiel Command (AMC), the Army Air Forces Technical Service Command (TSC), and the Air Technical Service Command (ATSC) as a separate research and development command in 1950.  It incorporated Air Proving Ground Command in 1957. On 1 July 1992, AFSC and Air Force Logistics Command were merged to form the Air Force Materiel Command, located at Wright-Patterson Air Force Base, Ohio.

In the reorganization of 1961, Air Force Systems Command acquired the materiel procurement function from Air Force Logistics Command. It was re-integrated with Air Force Logistics Command in 1992.

History

Origins 
The origins of Air Force Systems Command date at least to the establishment of the Airplane Engineering Department by the Chief Signal Officer, U.S. Army, on 13 October 1917 at McCook Field, Ohio. Re-designated the Engineering Division of the U.S. Army Air Service in March 1919, this organization carried out the research, development and testing of military aircraft, engines, airships and accessories.  Renamed the Materiel Division of the newly established Army Air Corps in October 1926, it undertook the procurement, supply and maintenance activities of Army aviation.

American aviation development fell behind its European rivals after the mid-1930s when Germany started a continental arms race. The threat of war at the decade's end began to change the situation. During the late 1930s American industry spent over $100 million annually on aviation research. University grants grew and military personnel enrollment in science courses increased. Leaders of the Army Air Forces (AAF) were alarmed by many of the new weapons that would revolutionize air warfare which had emerged from foreign laboratories. Radar, jet aircraft (Messerschmitt Me 262, Fieseler Fi 103 (V-1 flying bomb)) and ballistic missiles (V-2 rocket) had all either originated or been perfected outside the United States.  Congress greatly increased funds for R&D.  Subsequently, the engineering function resided in the Materiel Command, the AAF Technical Service Command, the Air Technical Service Command, and the Air Materiel Command.

The war had shown the destructiveness of aerial attack and made Arnold an aggressive advocate for aeronautical research. On 7 November 1944, General Henry H. "Hap" Arnold, Commanding General of the Army Air Forces, directed the AAF Scientific Advisory Group (SAG) to study the technological achievements of America's wartime allies and provide a blueprint for large-scale research and development of science and advanced technology for the Air Force.

However, the Army Air Forces needed to achieve independence, which it did on 18 September 1947, with its transition into an independent United States Air Force.  Also, the role of the Air Force in the postwar world had to be defined.  The 1948 Finletter Commission published its report, Survival in the Air Age, in January 1948. It set forth a new concept of airpower, i.e., a powerful peacetime force able to counter any enemy air attack. The Finletter Report inspired a group of senior USAF officers with backgrounds in engineering and related fields to analyze the existing R&D organization.  Their findings, and the salesmanship of Generals Jimmy Doolittle and Donald Putt, convinced Air Force Chief of Staff General Hoyt S. Vandenberg to put the R&D mission on a more equal footing with the operational Air Force. Accordingly, and in the face of intense Air Staff opposition, on 23 January 1950, the Research and Development Command (RDC) came into being. Eight months later it was re-designated the Air Research and Development Command (ARDC) as a separate organization devoted strictly to research and development.

Cold War 

Research and Development Command was redesignated the Air Research and Development Command (ARDC) on 16 September 1950, and the Arnold Engineering Development Center was dedicated by President Harry S. Truman on 25 June 1951.

During the 1950s, the new command began to make its mark. ARDC developed many ambitious aircraft and missile prototypes. Among the successes of this period were the North American F-86 Sabre swept wing fighter, the Boeing B-52 Stratofortress intercontinental bomber, the Boeing KC-135 Stratotanker jet-powered refueling tanker aircraft, the Lockheed C-130 Hercules turboprop transport and the Lockheed U-2 very high-altitude strategic reconnaissance aircraft.  In addition, ARDC played a major contribution in the development of Intercontinental ballistic missiles (ICBMs), which became a priority after the world learned that the Soviet Union had detonated a thermonuclear (hydrogen) bomb on 23 August 1953. A crash program was employed which developed America's first ICBM (the SM-65D Atlas), that became operational in 1959. In terms of importance, resources, and success, the ICBM program was rivaled only by the famed Manhattan Project of World War II.

AIMACO, the "Supply Control Command compiler" for Air Materiel Command, began circa 1959 with the definition of a high level programming language influenced by the UNIVAC Flow-Matic and COMTRAN programming languages.  The draft AIMACO language definition was developed by an AMC-chaired committee of industry representatives from IBM, United States Steel, and AMC Programming Services. AIMACO had two compilers specified/designed (never produced), and AMC originally intended all programming for AMC systems would be in AIMACO and compiled on a UNIVAC at the AMC headquarters at Wright-Patterson AFB for operation on UNIVAC or IBM computers. An alternative compiler was designed by AMC Programming Services to compile systems on IBM computers for operation on IBM computers.  AIMACO, along with FLOW-MATIC and COMTRAN, influenced development of the COBOL programming language.

The Atlas program led to the belief that the entire responsibility for deploying new weapons systems – from research, development and testing through procurement and production – should be vested in one command, rather than split between Air Materiel Command (AMC) and ARDC.  It was the Soviet Union's launch of Sputnik 1 in October 1957 that greatly influenced HQ USAF and ARDC thinking. The Stever Report, completed in June 1958, which proposed a new Air Force command for weapons acquisition. With this report and a realization of DoD's desire to assign the military space mission to the Air Force, the Air Force won the approval of Secretary of Defense Robert S. McNamara in 1961 for a new major command. In the reorganization and re-designation actions of 1961, Air Materiel Command was re-designated Air Force Logistics Command (AFLC) while Air Research and Development Command, gaining responsibility for weapon system acquisition, was re-designated Air Force Systems Command (AFSC) under General Bernard Schriever.

Under the Kennedy Administration, Secretary McNamara instituted powerful centralization tools in acquisition such as the Total Package Procurement concept (TPP). This system shifted many major program management functions to the Pentagon. Stressing computer modeling, concurrency, and paper competitions among the contractors, TPP sharply curtailed the flexibility of Systems Command program managers. Cost overruns and serious technical difficulties in such TPP programs as the Lockheed C-5 Galaxy and General Dynamics F-111 Aardvark lead to drastic changes in DoD acquisition practices. In 1970, Deputy Secretary of Defense David Packard revised many McNamara policies. He decentralized the acquisition system and reemphasized prototyping in weapons development.

Vietnam era and aftermath 

As the Vietnam War dominated the late 1960s and early 1970s, AFSC focused on quick solutions to the needs of operational units in the Southeast Asia (SEA) war zone. Areas such as Electronic warfare (ECM) (Douglas EB-66 Destroyer) were greatly expanded in response to the North Vietnamese Surface-to-air missile (SAM) air defense systems.  The modification of transports (AC-130 Hercules, AC-119 Flying Boxcar) into gunships, improved reconnaissance sensors, the Defense Meteorological Satellite Program, Forward Looking Infrared Sensors (FLIR), and Precision-guided munitions all represented significant AFSC contributions to Air Force operations in Southeast Asia.

The sustained growth of Soviet power after the Cuban Missile Crisis challenged the entire spectrum of U.S. military capabilities. These factors led to a new wave of Air Force weapons development beginning in the late 1960s. Systems Command found itself managing a broad array of new tactical and strategic programs including the McDonnell Douglas F-15 Eagle, General Dynamics F-16 Fighting Falcon fighters, the Fairchild Republic A-10 Thunderbolt II ground support aircraft, the LGM-118 Peacekeeper, the AGM-86 (air) and BGM-109 (ground) cruise missiles, the Boeing E-3 Sentry Airborne Warning and Control System, the Boeing C-17 Globemaster III transport, the Rockwell B-1 Lancer bomber, and a new generation of orbiting Reconnaissance satellites.  These programs were the main activities of AFSC during the 1970s.

With the Reagan Administration's military buildup during the 1980s, the pace and scope of Air Force acquisition again escalated. Now the focus centered on the modernization of strategic systems which had atrophied during the Vietnam era and afterward. But increased activity and defense spending brought acquisition reform issues to the forefront. Cost, schedule, and quality problems troubled some major weapons programs.
Media stories about spare parts overpricing and questionable contractor overhead charges created a national sensation. This negative publicity, coupled with soaring federal deficits and reductions in domestic spending, contributed by the middle of the decade to a political backlash against Ronald Reagan's military programs. The situation gave enormous political impetus to reductions of defense spending and an overhaul of the nation's military establishment, including its weapons acquisition practices. AFSC led the way for acquisition improvements with greater reliance on multi-year contracting to stabilize weapons programs and increased investment in modernization programs for the defense industrial base. On 26 April 1984 the vice-commander of AFSC, Lieutenant General Robert M. Bond, was killed during a retirement visit to the 6513th Test Squadron at Groom Lake while flying a Mikoyan-Gurevich MiG-23 at over Mach 2.

During this turbulent period, new and updated weapons systems continued to join the USAF. The B-1B Lancer was delivered to SAC in record time, though with significant problems that would hamper its service career for some time. Stealth technology found its way to the ramps in the form of the F-117 Nighthawk fighter-bomber and the B-2 Spirit bomber. After the Space Shuttle Challenger disaster, AFSC helped restore the nation's space launch capability by quickly making available a family of new expendable launch vehicles such as the Delta II. Major gains were made in operational readiness rates through the Reliability and Maintainability	(R&M) 2000 program.

Inactivation 
With the 1992 reorganization of the Air Force, the functions of AFSC and Air Force Logistics Command (AFLC) were once again merged into the new Air Force Materiel Command (AFMC).

Lineage
 Established as Research and Development Command on 23 January 1950
 Organized as a major command on 1 February 1950
 Re-designated: Air Research and Development Command on 16 September 1950
 Re-designated: Air Force Systems Command on 1 April 1961
 Inactivated on 1 July 1992.

Assignments
 Air Materiel Command, 23 January 1950
 United States Air Force, 1 February 1950 – 1 July 1992

Stations
 Baltimore, Maryland, 23 January 1950
 Andrews Air Force Base, Maryland, 24 January 1958 – 1 July 1992.

Command bases and major units

 Brooks AFB, Texas, 1 November 1961 – 1 July 1992
 USAF Aerospace Medical Center
 Museum of Flight Medicine
 USAF Human Resources Laboratory
 USAF Medical Service Center

 Edwards AFB, California, 2 April 1951 – 1 July 1992
 USAF Flight Test Center
 USAF Test Pilot School
 USAF Rocket Propulsion Laboratory
 412th Test Wing

 Eglin AFB, Florida, 1 December 1957 – 1 July 1992
 USAF Armament Development Test Center
 3246th Test Wing

 Griffiss AFB, New York, 2 April 1951 – 1 July 1954
 Rome Air Development Center

 Vandenberg AFB, California, 21 June 1957 – 1 January 1958
 1st Strategic Aerospace Division

 Hickam AFB, Hawaii
 6594th Test Group - satellite photo recovery

 Hanscom AFB, Massachusetts, 1 August 1951 – 1 July 1992
 USAF Cambridge Research Center
 USAF Command and Control Development Division
 USAF Geophysics Laboratory
 Electronic Systems Division
 USAF Computer Acquisition Center

 Holloman AFB, New Mexico, 2 April 1951 – 1 January 1971
 USAF Missile Development Center

 Kirtland AFB, New Mexico, 1 April 1952 – 1 July 1977
 USAF Special Weapons Center
 USAF Research Laboratory
 4900th Air Base Wing
 4925th Test Group

 Patrick AFB, Florida, 14 May 1951 – 1 October 1991
 Includes Cape Canaveral Air Force Station, Florida
 Air Force Eastern Test Range
 6555th Aerospace Test Group
 Eastern Space and Missile Center

Commanders of Air Force Systems Command

References

Systems Command
Military units and formations established in 1950
1950 establishments in the United States
1992 disestablishments in the United States
Logistics units and formations of the United States Air Force
Military units and formations of the United States in the Cold War